Jagna, officially the Municipality of Jagna, is a 3rd class municipality in the province of Bohol, Philippines. According to the 2020 census, it has a population of 35,832 people.

Jagna is located on the southern coast of Bohol. It is one of the commercial trading centers of the province with daily market and port operations.  Of interest to visitors is the town church built during the Spanish era, with its ceiling frescoes and baroque architecture. A waterfall and a spring reservoir can be found on the highlands, accessible by road travel north. A marine sanctuary zone has been set up by the local government just off the shore. A double reef is protected inside the sanctuary zone and marked off by buoys to restrict access from fishers.

Like Tagbilaran, Jagna is a port town. Ferries travel daily to and from other islands. Routes to Mindanao are available via Cagayan de Oro and Butuan. The island of Camiguin is visible from Jagna and a ferry operates from Jagna to the port of Balbagon in peak seasons.

The town celebrates St. Michael's festival on September 29. Highlights are cultural activities such as parades and street dancing. The month of May is also of interest, especially to returning Jagna-born Filipinos from across the islands and abroad. Celebrations of barangay fiestas occur almost every day.

History

On January 24, 1744, an Italian Jesuit curate in-charge of the town parish was killed by a native insurgent known to be Francisco Dagohoy. This event signaled the beginning of the Dagohoy Rebellion – the longest uprising in Philippine history.

The Lonoy Massacre in 1901 was a bloody American surprise attack launched on Filipino insurgents – the latter being led by Captain Gregorio Caseñas – which were killed over 400, in the Philippine–American War. It was fought in the mountain village of Lonoy, north of the town proper.

A major earthquake devastated the town in 1992. The local residents were evacuated to the nearby hills for a few days, as local authorities warned of a possible tsunami that might hit the coastal area. However, such event did not happen. Some damage occurred to the church bell tower by the earthquake but has been completely repaired.

Jagna has a new market; the last one burned down in 1998 and a temporary market was set up in the grass field across the church. The new market is in operation – built on the site of the previous one that burned down. A recreational plaza is recently in construction on the grass field that was once the temporary market area.

Geography

Barangays

Jagna comprises 33 barangays:

Climate

Demographics

Economy

Gallery

Notes

References

External links
 Bohol
 [ Philippine Standard Geographic Code]
 Municipality of Jagna
 Jagna Bohol
 Latest Jagna News Tubag Bohol
 Jagna

Municipalities of Bohol